Oolong is a kind of Chinese tea. This may also mean:

Udon, a Japanese noodle called oolong in Chinese
Oolong (Dragon Ball), a character in the Dragon Ball series
Oolong (rabbit), the name of a popular Japanese rabbit
Oolong, New South Wales, a crossing loop on the Sydney to Albury Railway.
Oolong, a main character from Yie-Ar Kung Fu.
 Oolong (programming language), an assembler for the Java Virtual Machine
Oolong Island, a fictional location from the DC Comics series 52.

See also
 Ulong (disambiguation)